Hipparchia sbordonii, the Ponza grayling, is a butterfly of the family Nymphalidae.
It is an endemic species found only on the Pontine Islands of Italy.

References

External links
Fauna Europaea

sbordonii
Butterflies of Europe
Fauna of Italy
Endemic fauna of Italy
Butterflies described in 1984